Catherine Ouedraogo (born 1 February 1962, in Réo) is a Women Human Rights Defender. She has run the Fondation Cardinale Emile Biyenda (FOCEB) shelter in Ouagadougou since 2005. The shelter takes in girls aged 12 to 18 who have survived rape, early and forced marriage and unwanted pregnancy.  Between 2001 and 2009, the shelter has accommodated at least 209 girls and their 168 children, who were either born there or taken in with their mothers.

Career 
Catherine Ouedraogo has worked on environmental protection. She and the shelter she runs (FOCEB), have campaigned alongside Amnesty International for the rights of girls in Burkina Faso, as part of the "My Body, My Rights" campaign, which focused on forced and early marriage and lack of access to contraception.

Awards 
She was awarded in 2009 with a Laureates award for her creative innovation in rural life by WWSF.

References 

1962 births
Living people
Women's rights in Burkina Faso